Israel Crosby (January 19, 1919 – August 11, 1962) was an American jazz double-bassist born in Chicago, Illinois, United States. One of the finest to emerge during the 1930s, he was also a member of the Ahmad Jamal trio for most of 1954 to 1962. He is credited with taking one of the first recorded full-length bass solos, on his 1935 recording of "Blues of Israel" with drummer Gene Krupa when he was only 16. Crosby died of a heart attack at age 43, two months after joining the Shearing Quintet.

Discography

As sideman
With Ahmad Jamal
 Ahmad's Blues (1951, 1955)
 Ahmad Jamal Plays (Parrot, 1955) also released as Chamber Music of the New Jazz (Argo, 1955)
The Ahmad Jamal Trio (Epic, 1955)
 Count 'Em 88 (Argo, 1956)
 At the Pershing: But Not for Me (1958)
 Live at The Pershing & The Spotlight Club (1958)
 Portfolio of Ahmad Jamal (1958)
 Moonlight in Vermont (1958)
 Happy Moods (Argo, 1960)
 Listen to the Ahmad Jamal Quintet (Argo, 1960)
 Ahmad Jamal's Alhambra (Argo, 1961)
All of You (Argo, 1961)
Ahmad Jamal at the Blackhawk (Argo, 1962)
 Cross Country Tour 1958-1961 (1962)
 Poinciana (1963)
 Extensions (1965)
 Heat Wave (1966)
 Standard Eyes (1967)
With others
 Lorez Alexandria: Deep Roots (Argo, 1962)
 Albert Ammons: 1936-1939 (Classics)
 Chu Berry: and his Stompy Stevedores (1937)
 Charlie Christian: Solo Flight (Topaz, 1939–1941)
 Vic Dickenson: Breaks, Blues and Boogie (Topaz, 1941–1946)
 Roy Eldridge: 1943-1944 (Classics), The Big Sound of Little Jazz (Topaz, 1935–41)
 Herb Ellis: The Midnight Roll (Eipc, 1962) (last recording session)
 Edmond Hall: 1936-1944 (Classics)
 Coleman Hawkins: The Complete Coleman Hawkins (Mercury, 1944), Rainbow Mist (Delmark, 1944 [1992]), Verve Jazz Masters 34 (Verve, 1944–62)
 Fletcher Henderson: 1934-1937 (Classics)
 Horace Henderson: 1940 (Classics)
Sam Jones:  Down Home (Riverside, 1962)
 Gene Krupa: 1935-1938 (Classics)
 Meade Lux Lewis: Boogie And Blues (Topaz, 1936–1941)
 George Shearing: Jazz Moments (Capitol, 1962) (Blue Note as of 2008)
 Jess Stacy: 1935-1939 (Classics)
 Earl Washington: (Classics) (Workshop - Motown Imprint, 1962)

References

American jazz double-bassists
Male double-bassists
Cool jazz double-bassists
Jazz musicians from Illinois
Musicians from Chicago
1919 births
1962 deaths
20th-century American musicians
20th-century double-bassists
20th-century American male musicians
American male jazz musicians
20th-century African-American musicians